My Best Days is the debut studio album from American Idol season eight finalist Danny Gokey. The album was released on March 2, 2010, by RCA Records Nashville. The track "It's Only" was originally scheduled to be the first single, but it was withdrawn and replaced with "My Best Days Are Ahead of Me." Both it and the album's second single, "I Will Not Say Goodbye," have made Top 40 on Hot Country Songs.

Critical reception

Matt Bjorke of Roughstock gave a positive review, saying that its sound recalled country pop and contemporary Christian music, but also saying that it, "sure feels like Danny Gokey has gotten himself a strong set of songs that find him in strong voice." Allmusic reviewer Stephen Thomas Erlewine gave the album two stars out of five, calling it "pristine adult contemporary pop, all soft and glittering." Brian Mansfield of USA Today gave it a positive review saying, "All in all, My Best Days continues in the vein of the three earlier albums from the four top finishers of Season 8, in that it plays exceptionally well to the strengths of the performers and the expectations their existing fans have for them."

Jessica Phillips of Country Weekly magazine gave three-and-a-half stars out of five, with her review saying, "it is refreshing to find a new artist with a solid message and genuineness to match." Deborah Evans Price of Billboard praised Gokey's vocal performance and said "Working with producer Mark Bright, Gokey crafted a contemporary country album that showcases his soulful vocals."

Commercial performance
The album debuted at number four on the Billboard 200 for the chart week of March 9, 2010, selling 65,000 copies in its first week. My Best Days is the best debut for a male country solo artist since Billy Ray Cyrus' Some Gave All album debuted with 90,000 copies in June 1992. My Best Days sold 19,000 digital albums its first week, giving it the highest first week digital album sales ever for a new Country artist. As of December 29, 2010, the album has sold 201,000 copies in the U.S.

Track listing

Personnel
Compiled from liner notes.
 Tom Bukovac — electric guitar
 Lisa Cochran — background vocals
 Eric Darken — percussion
 Aubrey Haynie — fiddle
 Chris McHugh — drums
 Mike Johnson — steel guitar
 Charles Judge — keyboard, synthesizer, strings
 Gordon Mote — keyboard, synthesizer, piano
 Jimmie Lee Sloas — bass guitar
 Ilya Toshinsky — acoustic guitar, mandolin
 Jonathan Yudkin — fiddle

Charts

Weekly charts

Year end charts

References 

2010 debut albums
Danny Gokey albums
RCA Records albums
Albums produced by Mark Bright (record producer)
19 Recordings albums